El nudo is a Spanish thriller drama television series starring Cristina Plazas, Miquel Fernández, Oriol Tarrasón and Natalia Verbeke which consists of an adaptation of the Argentine series Amar después de amar. Produced by Atresmedia in collaboration with Diagonal TV, it originally aired from to November 2019 to February 2020 on Atresplayer Premium.

Premise 
The fiction follows two troubled marriages, formed by Cristina and Sergio and Rebeca and Daniel. The plot starts with a car accident involving Daniel in which another woman was present, upsetting the second of the marriages.

Cast 
 Cristina Plazas as Rebeca.
  as Sergio.
  as Daniel.
 Natalia Verbeke as Cristina.
 Luisa Gavasa as Miriam.
 Enrique Villén as Godoy.
  as Javier.
 Silvia Maya as Cynthia.
  as Alberto Bécker.
  as Nerea.
 Berta Galo as Mía.
 Astrid Janer as Lola.
  as Nico.
 Rafa Ortiz as Andrés Bécker.
 Javier Morgade as Fede.
  as Joanna.
  as Elio del Arco.

Production and release 
The writing team, coordinated by Nuria Bueno, was formed by José Ángel Lavilla, Nicolás Romero and Nacho Pérez de la Paz. Sonia Martínez, Jaume Banacolocha and Montse García were credited as executive producers.

The series was primarily shot in location in the Community of Madrid and the Province of Segovia. Production wrapped in October 2019 after 5 months of filming.

The series was presented at the FesTVal in September 2019. Consisting of 13 episodes featuring a running time of around 50 minutes, El nudo premiered on 24 November 2019 on Atresplayer Premium, becoming the platform's first original series. The broadcasting run ended on 16 February 2020.

References 

Atresplayer Premium original programming
2010s Spanish drama television series
2020s Spanish drama television series
Spanish thriller television series
Spanish-language television shows
Spanish television series based on non-Spanish television series
Television shows filmed in Spain
Non-Argentine television series based on Argentine television series
2019 Spanish television series debuts
2020 Spanish television series endings
Television series by Diagonal TV